Temple Nwaogu is an Anglican bishop in Nigeria: he is the current Bishop of Isiala-Ngwa, one of nine within the Anglican Province of Aba, itself one of 14 provinces within the Church of Nigeria.

Notes

Living people
Anglican bishops of Isiala-Ngwa
21st-century Anglican bishops in Nigeria
Year of birth missing (living people)